McMahon Cogeneration Plant is a natural gas power station owned by Heartland Generation (50%) and NorthRiver Midstream (50%). The plant is located in Taylor, British Columbia. The plant is primarily used to supply steam to a gas processing plant owned by NorthRiver Midstream and power onto the British Columbia Grid through a long-term power sale agreement with BC Hydro.

Description
The plant consists of:
  Two Westinghouse CW251B12 gas turbines
 Two Deltak heat recovery steam generators

References

Natural gas-fired power stations in British Columbia